James Brooks (November 10, 1807 – April 30, 1873) was an American educator, lawyer, and politician who served as a U.S. representative from New York during the latter half of the American Civil War.

Personal and education 
He was born on November 10, 1807, in or near Portland, Maine. State Senator Erastus Brooks (1815–1886) was his brother. As a student, he attended public schools and then the academy at Monmouth, Maine. By the age of 16, he was teaching school, in Lewiston, Maine. He graduated from Waterville College (now Colby College) in 1831.

While reading law with John Neal, Brooks also worked as an editor for the Portland Advertiser.

Political career 
After finishing law studies, he worked as the Advertiser's Washington correspondent. He served as a member of the Maine House of Representatives in 1835 and lost a Congressional election in 1836. After losing, he moved to New York City and founded the New York Daily Express, where he was editor-in-chief for the rest of his life. He was a member of the New York State Assembly (New York Co., 16th D.) in  1848.

He was elected, as a Whig, to the Thirty-first and Thirty-second Congresses (March 4, 1849 - March 3, 1853). He lost a race for re-election in 1852 and resumed his editorial pursuits.

In the 1860 U.S. presidential election, Brooks would support the Constitutional Union Party ticket of John Bell and Edward Everett, but by the outbreak of the American Civil War, he had come to align himself with Fernando Wood and his Mozart Hall faction of New York City's Tammany Hall. Throughout the conflict, Brooks would serve as one of Wood's chief lieutenants, arguing alongside Wood against the use of coercion or force to restore the Union, resulting in them both being recognized throughout the North as outspoken leaders in the anti-war Copperhead movement.

Tenure in Congress 
Brooks was elected as a Democrat to the Thirty-eighth Congress (March 4, 1863 – March 3, 1865). He presented credentials as a Member-elect to the Thirty-ninth Congress, after a disputed election; he served from March 4, 1865, until April 7, 1866. He was succeeded by William E. Dodge, who had contested the election and won his case.

In 1866, Brooks was elected as a Democrat to the Fortieth Congress, and to the three succeeding Congresses. He was a Member of Congress until his death in 1873.

Brooks served as member of the New York State constitutional convention in 1867. That same year, he was appointed a government director of the Union Pacific Railroad.

Censure 
Brooks was censured by the House of Representatives on February 27, 1873, for attempted bribery, in connection with the Crédit Mobilier of America scandal.

Death 
Brooks died in Washington, D.C., April 30, 1873. He was interred at Green-Wood Cemetery, in Brooklyn, New York.

See also
List of United States representatives expelled, censured, or reprimanded
List of federal political scandals in the United States
List of United States Congress members who died in office (1790–1899)

References

Citations

Sources

 Retrieved on 2009-05-12.

External links
 

|-

|-

|-

1810 births
1873 deaths
19th-century American male writers
19th-century American newspaper editors
19th-century American politicians
American male journalists
Burials at Green-Wood Cemetery
Censured or reprimanded members of the United States House of Representatives
Colby College alumni
Democratic Party members of the United States House of Representatives from New York (state)
Journalists from New York City
Members of the Maine House of Representatives
Members of the New York State Assembly
New York (state) Whigs
People of New York (state) in the American Civil War
Politicians from Portland, Maine
Whig Party members of the United States House of Representatives
Members of the United States House of Representatives from New York (state)
Categiry:Copperheads (politics)